Meck Island is part of the Kwajalein Atoll in the Ralik Chain in the Republic of the Marshall Islands,  southwest of Honolulu, Hawaii.

Meck is part of the Ronald Reagan Ballistic Missile Defense Test Site, and a launch site for anti-ballistic missiles and launch vehicles is based there. It was originally developed in support of the Sentinel program of the 1960s, and hosted a radar site and launchers for Sprint and Spartan missiles. It has been used for a variety of tests since then, including the Safeguard program, Homing Overlay Experiment, Exoatmospheric Kill Vehicle, THAAD and others.

References

Kwajalein Atoll
Islands of the Marshall Islands